The 2005 Euro Beach Soccer League, was the eighth edition of the Euro Beach Soccer League (EBSL), originally known as the European Pro Beach Soccer League, the premier beach soccer competition contested between European men's national teams, occurring annually since its establishment in 1998. The league was organised by Beach Soccer Worldwide (BSWW) between July 8 and August 28, 2005 in five different nations across Europe.

Following the preceding season, BSWW continued organising the nations of the EBSL across three divisions (A, B and C), with each team competing in their respective division to try and earn a place in the season-finale event, the Superfinal, in which the league title was then contested directly.

Italy were ultimately crowned champions, coming back from 5–1 down in the last period of the final to win their first European title. France entered the league as defending champions but lost in the Superfinal semi-finals, finishing the league in third place.

Teams
This season 16 nations took part in the Euro Beach Soccer League whom were and were distributed as follows:

Division A (4)

Division B (8)

Division C (4)

Superfinal berths
There were eight berths available in this season's Superfinal. The table summarises in what positions nations needed to finish in their respective divisions in order to qualify to the Superfinal, what round of the Superfinal they would enter finishing in said positions, and the seeding they would receive.

Allocations

Division A was awarded four Superfinal berths (with only four teams in the division, all teams automatically qualified - the teams played to try and win the division in order to earn the single berth straight into the Superfinal semi-finals and, failing this, attain the best seeding possible)
Division B received three berths and Division C, one.

Play off round
Since the Division A winners received a bye in the quarter-finals, this meant one of the four quarter-final ties was to be void. The three other quarter-final matches only had enough spaces to accommodate six of the other seven teams qualified for Superfinal. 
Hence BSWW decided the top five of the remaining seven teams would go straight into the quarters, whilst a play-off round would take place between the two lowest ranked qualifiers (3rd Division B v Winner Division C) to determine who gets the final sixth quarter-final spot. The loser and now leftover seventh nation would have to settle for the consolation matches.

Division A
Division A consisted of four rounds of fixtures known as stages, with one stage hosted in each of the four countries participating as shown. All four teams took part in each. In each stage, the teams played each other once. The nation who earned the most points at the end of the stage was crowned stage winners.

At the end of the four stages all results were tallied up in a final league table.

Stage 1
The first stage took place in Tignes, France. Portugal won the event.

Matches

Final standings

Stage 2
The second stage took place in Figueira da Foz, Portugal. The hosts claimed their second stage win.

Matches

Final standings

Stage 3
The third and penultimate stage took place in Cervia, Italy. The hosts earned their first stage victory. Portugal earned enough points during this stage to secure first place in the final division standings.

Matches

Final standings

Stage 4
The fourth and final stage took place in Santa Ponsa, Mallorca, Spain. Portugal won their third stage title.

Matches

Final standings

Final table
All four teams automatically qualified to the Superfinal. However, finishing top of the division table earned that team a bye straight into the semifinals, whilst the final positions of the other three nations determined seedings in the quarter-finals.

Portugal were crowned winners, earning the bye into the Superfinal semi finals. Spain, by finishing second, ensured the next highest seeding meaning they would be drawn against the worst ranked team to make the Superfinal (the play-off winners) in the quarter-finals. On the other hand, France, finishing last, received the lowest seeding in Division A and hence suffered the consequences of having to play the next best seed, the winners of Division B.

Division B

Results

This season, Division B was played as a straight knockout tournament. The eight teams contesting the division started in the quarter-finals, playing one match per round until the final when the winner was crowned. The losers of the quarter-finals played in consolation matches to determine their final division placements.

Final standings
The top two nations qualified straight into the Superfinal quarter-finals along with three sides from Division A. The third placed team qualified to the Superfinal play-off round to contest the sixth and final quarter-final spot against the winners of Division C. The remaining Division B nations exited this season's EBSL.

Hungary won the Division B tournament title, whilst hosts Austria claimed the third and final spot in the Superfinal.

Division C
The nations comprising Division C contested one round of fixtures. The teams played each other once. The nation who earned the most points at the end of the matches was crowned winner the division.

Matches
The fixtures were played in Santa Ponsa, Mallorca, Spain, alongside stage 4 of Division A.

Final table
The winners solely qualified to the Superfinal play-off round to play the lowest ranked qualifier from Division B to contest the sixth and final quarter-final spot. The remaining Division C nations exited this season's EBSL.

Switzerland were crowned winners.

Superfinal

Qualified teams
This is a summary of the teams who qualified for the Superfinal.

Results

This season the Superfinal was played as a straight knockout tournament. Six teams contesting the title started in the quarter-finals, with Portugal joining in the semifinals, playing one match per round until the final when the winner of the 2005 Euro Beach Soccer League was crowned. The losers of the quarter-finals and play-off round played in consolation matches to determine their final league placements.

Firstly, the play-off round took place between the winners of Division C and the lowest ranked qualifiers from Division B for reasons explained earlier. The winners, Switzerland, moved on to the quarter-finals. The losers, Austria, retreated to the consolidation matches.

Following the play-off round, the main knockout stages and consolation matches of the Superfinal took place.

Championship match details

Winners

Superfinal final standings
Italy beat favourites Portugal in the final on penalties to win their first Euro Beach Soccer League title.

Sources

 Roonba
 BSWW
 RSSSF
 

Euro Beach Soccer League
2005 in beach soccer